Kounina (Greek: Κουνινά) is a village in the municipal unit of Aigio, Achaea, Greece. It is located west of the river Selinountas, and 8 km southwest of Aigio. In 2011 Kounina had a population of 387 for the village and 479 for the community, which includes the villages Agia Anna, Pelekistra and Petrovouni. The village suffered damage from the 2007 Greek forest fires.

Population

External links
 Kounina GTP Travel Pages

See also

List of settlements in Achaea

References

Aigialeia
Aigio
Populated places in Achaea